The Fish family is a prominent American family, members of which became influential in politics, diplomacy, and business. The family is of English origin and is descended from Jonathan Fish (1615–1663), who was born in East Farndon, Northamptonshire, England, and ultimately settled in the Province of New York.

Notable members

 Nicholas Fish (1758–1833), an American Revolutionary soldier, an adjutant general of New York, a Federalist candidate for U.S. Representative from New York in 1804 and 1806, and a candidate for lieutenant governor of New York in 1810 and 1811.
 Hamilton Fish (1808–1893), a candidate for New York Assemblyman in 1834, a U.S. Representative from New York from 1843 to 1845, a candidate for lieutenant governor of New York in 1846, the lieutenant governor of New York in 1848, the governor of New York from 1849 to 1851, a U.S. Senator from New York from 1851 to 1857, the U.S. Secretary of State from 1869 to 1877.
 D. Maitland Armstrong (1836–1919), a U.S. consul in Rome, Italy 1869–1871; the U.S. Chargé d'Affaires to the Papal States 1869; the U.S. consul general in Rome, Italy 1871–1873.
 Stuyvesant Fish Morris (1843–1928), a prominent physician.
 Nicholas Fish II (1846–1902), the U.S. Chargé d'Affaires to Switzerland from 1877 to 1881, the U.S. minister to Belgium from 1882 to 1885.
 Hamilton Fish II (1849–1936), a New York Assemblyman 1874, 1876–1879, 1889–1891, and 1893–1896, a delegate to the Republican National Convention in 1884, and a U.S. Representative from New York from 1909 to 1911.
 Stuyvesant Fish (1851–1923), a businessman who served as president of the Illinois Central Railroad. 
 Hamilton Fish III (1888–1991), a New York Assemblyman from 1914 to 1916, a U.S. Representative from New York from 1920 to 1945, a New York Republican Committeeman in 1936.
 Hamilton Fish Armstrong (1893–1973), a U.S. diplomat; an editor of Foreign Affairs 1928–1972.
 Mildred Harnack (nee Fish) (1902-1943), member of Soviet Red Orchestra (espionage) spy ring in Nazi Germany during World War II, only American woman executed on the personal orders of Hitler
 Hamilton Fish IV (1926–1996), a U.S. Representative from New York 1969–1995 and a delegate to the Republican National Convention 1984.
 Hamilton Fish V (born 1952), an unsuccessful candidate for U.S. Representative from New York in 1988 and 1994.

Family tree

 Nicholas Fish (1758–1833) ∞ Elizabeth Stuyvesant (1775–1854)
 Margaret Ann Fish (1807–1877) ∞ John Neilson (1799–1851)
 Elizabeth Stuyvesant Neilson (1828–1902) ∞ Ezra Williams Howard (1818–1869)
 Thomas Howard (1862-1904) ∞ Rose Anthony Post (d. 1949)
 Elizabeth Stuyvesant Howard (1897–1988) ∞ Robert Winthrop Kean (1893–1980).
 Thomas Howard Howard (b. 1899)
 Mary Noel Neilson (1830–1908)
 Nicholas Fish Neilson (1832–1855)
 Margaret A. Neilson (1835–1905)
 John Neilson (1838–1903)
 Helen Neilson (1845–1927) ∞ David Maitland Armstrong (1836–1918)
 Margaret Neilson Armstrong (1867–1944)
 Helen Maitland Armstrong (1869–1948)
 Edward Maitland Armstrong (1874–1915)
 Marion Howard Armstrong (1880-1957) ∞ Alfred Edey
 Noel Maitland Armstrong (1882-1938)
 Bayard Armstrong (1887–1890)
 Hamilton Fish Armstrong (1893–1973) ∞ (1) 1918: (div. 1938) Helen MacGregor Byrne ∞ (2) 1945: (div. 1951) Carman Barnes (1912–1980) ∞ (3) 1951: Christa von Tippelskirch
 Helen MacGregor Armstrong (b. 1923) ∞ Edwin Gamble
 Susan Elizabeth Fish (1808–1892) ∞ Daniel LeRoy (1799–1885)
 Mary Augusta LeRoy (1829–1905) ∞ Edward King (1816–1875) (brother of George Gordon King)
 Edward Augustus King (1852–1878)
 Elizabeth Stuyvesant King (1855–1878)
 LeRoy King (1857–1895) ∞ Ethel Ledyard Rhinelander (1857–1925)
  Frederic Rhinelander King (1887–1972) ∞ Edith Percy Morgan (1891–1968)
 George Gordon King (1859–1922) ∞ Annie Mackenzie Coats (1860–1939)
 Mary LeRoy King (1862–1904)
 Edith Edgar King (1864–1942) ∞ Louis Butler McCagg
 Alexander Mercer King (1870–1885)
 Elizabeth Stuyvesant LeRoy (1834–1883) ∞ George Warren Dresser (1837–1883)
 Daniel LeRoy Dresser (1862–1915) ∞ Emma Louise Burnham (b. 1870)
 Suzanne Leroy Dresser (1864–1960) ∞ Vicomte Romain D'Osmoy
 Natalie Bayard Dresser (1869–1950) ∞ John Nicholas Brown I (1861–1900)
 John Nicholas Brown II (1900-1979) ∞ 1930: Anne Seddon Kinsolving (1906-1985)
 Nicholas Brown (b. 1933) ∞ Diane Verne
 John Carter Brown III (1934-2002) ∞ (1) Constance Mellon Byers (1942-1983), daughter of Richard King Mellon; ∞ (2) Pamela Braga Drexel
 Angela Bayard Brown (b. 1938) ∞ Edwin Garvin Fischer (b. 1937), grandson of Edwin Louis Garvin
 Edith Stuyvesant Dresser (1873–1958) ∞ (1) 1898: George Washington Vanderbilt II (1862–1914); ∞ (2) 1925: Peter Goelet Gerry (1879–1957)
 Cornelia Stuyvesant Vanderbilt ∞ John Francis Amherst Cecil (1890–1954)
 George Henry Vanderbilt Cecil (1925–2020)
 William Amherst Vanderbilt Cecil (1928–2017)
 Pauline Georgina Dresser (b. 1876) ∞ Rev. George D. Merrill
 Hamilton Fish (1808–1893) ∞ Julia Ursin Niemcewiez Kean (1816–1887), sister of John Kean and granddaughter of John Kean and Susan Livingston (Susan married Count Julian Ursyn Niemcewicz after Kean's death)
 Sarah Morris Fish (1838–1925) ∞ Sidney Webster (1828–1910)
 Hamilton Fish Webster (1861–1939)
 Julia Kean Fish (1841–1908) ∞ Samuel Nicholl Benjamin (1839–1886)
 Elizabeth d'Hauteville Benjamin (1871–1884)
 William Massena Benjamin (1874–1928)
 Hamilton Fish Benjamin (1877–1938)
 Julian Arnold Benjamin (1877–1953)
 Susan LeRoy Fish (1844–1909) ∞ William Evans Rogers (1846–1913)
 Nicholas Fish II (1846–1902) ∞ 1869: Clemence Smith Bryce (1847–1908), sister of Lloyd Bryce
 Hamilton Fish II (1873–1898)
 Hamilton Fish II (1849–1936) ∞ (1) Emily Maria Mann (1854–1899); ∞ (2) Florence Delaplaine Amsinck (1849–1926)
 Janet Fish (1883–1970)
 Julia Kean Fish (1884–1960) ∞ William Lawrence Breese (1883–1915)
 Hamilton Fish Breese (1910–1920)
 Emily Rosalind Fish (1886–1975) ∞ John Wilson Cutler (1887–1950)
 Hamilton Fish III (1888–1991) ∞ Grace Chapin Rogers (1885–1960), daughter of Alfred Clark Chapin; ∞ Marie Choubaroff (1905–1974); ∞ (4) 1988: Lydia Ambrogio (1932–2015)
 Lillian Veronica Fish ∞ David Whitmire Hearst (1915–1986), son of William Randolph Hearst
 Elizabeth Fish (1922-2015) ∞ Venkatesan Perry (1932-2016)
 Hamilton Fish IV (1926–1996) ∞ (1) 1951: Julia MacKenzie (1927–1969); ∞ (2) 1971: Billy Laster Cline (1924–1985); ∞ (3) 1989: Mary Ann Tinklepaugh Knauss (b. 1930)
 Hamilton Fish V (b. 1952) ∞ Sandra Harper
 Julia Alexandra Fish (b. 1953) ∞ Thomas Ward
 Nicholas Stuyvesant Fish (1958–2020)
 Peter Livingston Fish (b. 1959)
 Helena Livingston Fish (1893–1970) ∞ Henry Forster (1889–1989)
 Henry H. Forster (1921–2000)
 Bayard Stuyvesant Forster (1924–2001) ∞ Clare Chanler (1927–1992), granddaughter of Lewis Stuyvesant Chanler
 Sheila Emily Forster (1928–2011) ∞ J. Anthony G. Morris
 Stuyvesant Fish (1851–1923) ∞ 1876: Marion Graves Anthon (1853–1915)
 Livingston Fish (1879–1880) 
 Marian Anthon Fish (1880–1944) ∞ 1907: (div. 1934) Albert Zabriskie Gray (1881–1964), son of John Clinton Gray
 Stuyvesant Fish, Jr. (1883–1952) ∞ Isabelle Mildred Dick (1884–1972)
 Sidney Webster Fish (1885–1950) ∞ (1) 1915: Olga Martha Wiborg (1890–1937), daughter of Frank Bestow Wiborg; ∞ (2) 1929: Esther Foss, daughter of Eugene Noble Foss
 Edith Livingston Fish (b. 1856) ∞ Northcote 
 Elizabeth Sarah Fish (1810–1881) ∞ Richard Lewis Morris (1816–1880)
 Stuyvesant Fish Morris (1843–1928) ∞ Ellen James Van Buren (1844–1929), granddaughter of Martin Van Buren
 Elizabeth Marshall Morris (1869–1919) ∞ B. Woolsey Rogers
 Ellen Van Buren Morris (1873–1954) ∞ Francis Livingston Pell (1873–1945)
 Richard Lewis Morris III (b. 1875) ∞ Carolyn Whitney Fellowes (b. 1882)
 Stuyvesant Fish Morris, Jr. (1877–1925)

Kean family
The Fish family is related to the Kean family through Hamilton Fish's wife, Julia Ursin Niemcewiez Kean.

Notable members
 Hamilton Fish Kean (1862–1941), New Jersey Republican Committeeman 1905–1919, delegate to the Republican National Convention 1916, Republican National Committeeman 1919–1928, candidate for U.S. Senate from New Jersey 1924, U.S. Senator from New Jersey 1929–1935.
 Robert W. Kean (1893–1980), delegate to the Republican National Convention 1936, U.S. Representative from New Jersey 1939–1959, candidate for U.S. Senate from New Jersey 1958.
 Thomas H. Kean (born 1935), New Jersey Assemblyman 1968–1977, Governor of New Jersey 1982–1990.
 Thomas Kean Jr. (born 1968), New Jersey state senator 2003-2022 and U.S. Representative from 2023.

Family tree

John Kean (1814–1895)
Hamilton Fish Kean (1862–1941)
Robert W. Kean (1893–1980)
Thomas H. Kean (b. 1935)
Thomas Kean, Jr. (b. 1968)

NOTE: Hamilton Fish Kean was also great-grandson of Continental Congressional Delegate John Kean and brother of U.S. Senator John Kean.

References
Notes

Sources
Wing, Lester Fish. The Fish Family in England and America. Tuttle, 1948. 530pp.

 
Winthrop family
Political families of the United States